is a Japanese long-distance runner. He competed in the men's 5000 metres at the 1976 Summer Olympics.

References

External links
 

1951 births
Living people
Place of birth missing (living people)
Japanese male long-distance runners
Olympic male long-distance runners
Olympic athletes of Japan
Athletes (track and field) at the 1976 Summer Olympics
Japan Championships in Athletics winners
Sportspeople from Akita Prefecture
20th-century Japanese people
21st-century Japanese people